Peter James Sainsbury (13 June 1934 – 12 July 2014) was an English first-class cricketer who played for Hampshire from 1954 to 1976 and the Marylebone Cricket Club from 1955 to 1960.

Born in Chandler's Ford, Hampshire, Sainsbury was a right-handed middle-order batsman and a slow left-arm bowler. He was a regular in Hampshire's team for 22 seasons from 1955 to 1976. That period coincided with the county's most successful time in first-class cricket: Hampshire won the County Championship for the first time in 1961 and did it again in 1973. Sainsbury was the only player who featured in both teams, and he was named as a Wisden Cricketer of the Year in the 1974 edition of the almanack.

After a few games for Hampshire and the first-class Combined Services team in 1954, Sainsbury was a big success in his first full season in 1955, taking 102 wickets and scoring 586 runs. He was picked for the Marylebone Cricket Club (MCC) "A" tour to Pakistan in 1955–56 and played in two of the four representative matches. But in an era when England's spin bowling options included Tony Lock, Fred Titmus, Ray Illingworth and Derek Underwood, this was as close as he came to Test cricket.

In fact, Hampshire's successes over the next 20 years were built largely on seam bowling, first with Derek Shackleton and later, at the end of Sainsbury's career, with Andy Roberts, and Sainsbury took 100 wickets in a season only once more: 16 years later, in 1971. With no great spin, he was often used defensively as a bowler, but he took 50 or more wickets in 16 seasons. He was also successful in one-day cricket, one of the first slow bowlers to be used successfully in a form of cricket that was dominated in its early days by seam bowling. Indeed, in 1965 he became the first man to take seven wickets in a one-day match when he claimed 7–30 against Norfolk in the first round of the Gillette Cup.

His batting developed usefully. No stylist, he could tailor his game to the needs of the side, providing obduracy or attack as required. For a side that for many years relied very heavily on the runmaking of just two or three players, Sainsbury's runs, usually made at No 6 in the batting order, gave Hampshire solidity. He scored more than 1,000 runs in a season six times and in 1971 was within 50 runs of the all-rounder's double of 1000 runs and 100 wickets.

A superb fieldsman close to the wicket, Sainsbury was near the top of the fielding statistics for many seasons in the late 1950s and 1960s. In all first-class cricket, Sainsbury played in 618 matches, scored 20,176 runs, took 1,316 wickets, and held 617 catches. He retired from first-class cricket in 1976.

References

External links

1934 births
2014 deaths
English cricketers
Hampshire cricketers
Combined Services cricketers
International Cavaliers cricketers
Wisden Cricketers of the Year
Marylebone Cricket Club cricketers
Players cricketers
T. N. Pearce's XI cricketers